Cryptolestes ferrugineus  is a species of lined flat bark beetle native to Europe. It currently has a cosmopolitan distribution, and is referred to by the common name the rusty grain beetle. As the common name implies, the beetle is a grain pest.

References

Laemophloeidae
Beetles described in 1831
Beetles of Europe
Insect pests of wheat